Moon Sung-min (born September 14, 1986) is a male volleyball player from South Korea. He currently plays as an opposite spiker for the Cheonan Hyundai Capital Skywalkers in the V-League.

References

External links
 FIVB biography

1986 births
Living people
South Korean men's volleyball players
Expatriate volleyball players in Germany
South Korean expatriates in Germany
South Korean expatriate sportspeople in Turkey
Asian Games medalists in volleyball
Volleyball players at the 2006 Asian Games
Volleyball players at the 2010 Asian Games
Volleyball players at the 2018 Asian Games
Sportspeople from Busan
German men's volleyball players
Asian Games gold medalists for South Korea
Asian Games silver medalists for South Korea
Asian Games bronze medalists for South Korea
Expatriate volleyball players in Turkey
Halkbank volleyball players
Cheonan Hyundai Capital Skywalkers players
Medalists at the 2006 Asian Games
Medalists at the 2010 Asian Games
Medalists at the 2018 Asian Games
21st-century South Korean people